Phytoecia alinae is a species of beetle in the family Cerambycidae. It was described by Kasatkin in 2011. It is known from Turkey.

References

Phytoecia
Beetles described in 2011